Prince Malek Mansur Mirza (1880–1922) Iranian prince of Qajar dynasty, was Mozaffar al-Din Shah's second son, brother of Mohammad Ali Shah Qajar, Abul-fat'h Mirza Salar-ed-Dowleh and Abul-Fazl Mirza.

He was born at Tabriz, 30 March 1880 and educated by private tutors. He was governor of 1897, Governor-General of Fars 1901–1902 and 1904. He received the Decoration of the Imperial Portrait, the Neshan-e Aqdas 2nd class and Order of the Lion and the Sun 1st class from his father. He died at Tehran, 6 November 1922.

He is the progenitor of Malek-Mansur Family.

Honours
 Order of the Royal Portrait (Temsal-e-Homayoun) of Persia
 2nd Class of the Order of Neshan-e Aqdas of Persia
 1st Class of the Order of the Lion and the Sun of Persia
 1st class of the Order of the Crown of Persia
 Grand cross of the Order of Leopold of Austria
 Exalted Order of Honour (Nishan-i-Ali-Imtiaz) of Turkey

References

External links
 Pictorial biography of Malek Mansour Mirza, Qajarpages

Malek Mansur Mirza
Malek Mansur Mirza
People from Tabriz
Malek Mansur Mirza
Malek Mansur Mirza
People of the Persian Constitutional Revolution